Hill County is a county in the U.S. state of Texas. As of the 2020 census, its population was 35,874. Its county seat is Hillsboro. The county is named for George Washington Hill, secretary of war and secretary of the navy under the Republic of Texas. Hill County is part of Central Texas, though not included in Texas Hill Country.

Geography

Major highways

  Interstate 35
  Interstate 35E
  Interstate 35W
  U.S. Highway 77
  State Highway 22
  State Highway 31
  State Highway 81
  State Highway 171
  State Highway 174

Adjacent counties
 Johnson County (north)
 Ellis County (northeast)
 Navarro County (east)
 Limestone County (southeast)
 McLennan County (south)
 Bosque County (west)

Demographics

Note: the US Census treats Hispanic/Latino as an ethnic category. This table excludes Latinos from the racial categories and assigns them to a separate category. Hispanics/Latinos can be of any race.

As of the census of 2000,  32,321 people, 12,204 households, and 8,725 families were residing in the county.  The population density was 34 people/sq mi (13/km2).  The 14,624 housing units averaged 15/sq mi (6/km2).  The racial makeup of the county was 84.16% White, 7.40% African American, 0.44% Native American, 0.25% Asian, 6.04% from other races, and 1.71% from two or more races. About 13.49% of the population were Hispanics or Latinos of any race.

Of the 12,204 households,  30.70% had children under 18 living with them, 57.50% were married couples living together, 10.10% had a female householder with no husband present, and 28.50% were not families. About 24.80% of all households were made up of individuals, and 12.50% had someone living alone who was 65 or older. The average household size was 2.58, and the average family size was 3.07.

A Williams Institute analysis of 2010 census data found  about 3.2 same-sex couples per 1,000 households were in the county.

In the county, the age distribution was  25.90% under  18, 8.50% from 18 to 24, 24.90% from 25 to 44, 23.40% from 45 to 64, and 17.30% who were 65 or older.  The median age was 38 years. For every 100 females there were 96.70 males.  For every 100 females age 18 and over, there were 93.70 males.

The median income for a household in the county was $31,600, and for a family was $37,791. Males had a median income of $29,438 versus $20,765 for females. The per capita income for the county was $15,514.  About 11.90% of families and 15.70% of the population were below the poverty line, including 19.70% of those under age 18 and 14.60% of those age 65 or over.

Government
The Hill County Sheriff's Office is the  law enforcement agency  that oversees Hill County and operates the Hill County Jail in Hillsboro.  The current sheriff is Rodney B. Watson..The first Sheriff of Hill County was Charley Davis.

Media
Serving Hill County exclusively are media outlets KHBR Radio - 1560 AM and The Reporter newspaper.
Hill County is currently listed as part of the Dallas-Fort Worth DMA. Local media outlets include: KDFW-TV, KXAS-TV, WFAA-TV, KTVT-TV, KERA-TV, KTXA-TV, KDFI-TV, KDAF-TV, and KFWD-TV, although it is located in Central Texas and a neighboring county of the Waco metropolitan area. All of the Waco/Temple/Killeen market stations also provide coverage for Hill County. They include: KCEN-TV, KWTX-TV, KXXV-TV, KDYW, and KWKT-TV. Northland Cable Television continues to offer all of the above stations in Hillsboro.

Communities

Cities

 Abbott
 Aquilla
 Covington
 Hillsboro (county seat)
 Hubbard
 Itasca
 Mount Calm
 Whitney

Towns

 Blum
 Bynum
 Carl's Corner
 Malone
 Mertens
 Penelope

Unincorporated communities
 Birome
 Brandon
 Irene
 Peoria

Politics
Hill County, like most of the rural South, is currently overwhelmingly Republican. The last Democrat to carry Hill County was Bill Clinton in 1992. Before this, like most of Texas, Hill County was solidly Democratic: up to 1979, the county had voted Republican only against Catholic Al Smith in 1928 and against George McGovern in 1972.

See also

 National Register of Historic Places listings in Hill County, Texas
 Recorded Texas Historic Landmarks in Hill County

References

External links
 Hill County government's website
 

 
1853 establishments in Texas
Populated places established in 1853